Uwe or UWE may refer to
 Uwe (given name)
 University of the West of England, Bristol
 UML-based web engineering
 University Würzburg's Experimental miniaturized satellites for space research UWE-1 and UWE-2
 Uwe - Wreck in Blankenese